Nova High School is a public high school located in Davie, Florida and is part of the Broward County Public Schools district. It is one of four schools that comprise the Nova Center for Applied Research and Professional Development, the others being Nova Eisenhower Elementary School, Nova Blanche Forman Elementary School, and Nova Middle School. Nova Eisenhower Elementary, the newest of the three lower schools, began in downtown Ft. Lauderdale, in the old Fort Lauderdale High School building, while the current facility was being built in Davie.

The Nova campus is located within the South Florida Education Center, a consortium of area institutions which include the main campuses of Nova Southeastern University, Broward College, and the McFatter Technical Center, as well as regional campuses of the University of Florida and Florida Atlantic University. The school has been named a Blue Ribbon School of Excellence, and has earned a FCAT school grade of "A" every year since 1999, with only one "B" grade in the 2002–2003 year.

History 

Nova High School was established in 1960, and opened in September 1963, as a joint project between the Broward County Public Schools and Ford Foundation. Known as the Nova Educational Experiment, the project aimed to create a community of schools spanning elementary to university level education in one location.  Forman Field, the 545-acre site of a vacated naval aviation facility and located in the then rural areas of Broward County was chosen as the site for the project.

The Nova schools were originally jointly funded by the Ford Foundation and local sources, and were known for their progressive curricula and use of experimental teaching methods.  Students were required to pass an entrance exam for acceptance and a lengthy waiting list often existed for potential students. The school year consisted of eleven months of instruction, with a one-month summer break.

Nova was the beta testing site for "Propaganda" and a number of other academic games. The earliest national academic games tournaments were held on the Nova campus during the late 1960s.

After the Nova Educational Experiment ended in the 1970s, the Ford Foundation departed and total control of the Nova schools reverted to the Broward County Public Schools.  Entrance requirements were relaxed, however, as of 1985, placement on a waiting list for entry into the schools was still required.

During the 1980s, the schools' special status had begun to chafe within the workings of the school board. School board movements to close or consolidate the schools resulted in heated contention between parents, students and the board, often accompanied by noisy public meetings.

The Nova schools have consistently ranked at the very top of schools in the state.  Nova High School was ranked as the 237th best public high school in the United States, 36th best in Florida, by Newsweek Magazine in 2007 and is listed as a Silver Medal School by the U.S. News & World Report in 2008, placing it within the top 3% of all high schools in the country.

Nova High School is also well known for its extensive course offerings, including 22 Advanced Placement courses.  Nova graduates consistently matriculate to some of the finest colleges and universities in Florida and throughout the country.

Demographics and statistics 
As of the 2021-22 school year, the total student enrollment was 2,279. The ethnic makeup of the school was 31.6% White, 59% Black, 21.6% Hispanic, 5% Asian, 3.2% Multiracial, 0.9% Native American or Native Alaskan, and 0.3% Native Hawaiian or Pacific Islander.

Nova High School was awarded a grade of "A" by the Florida Department of Education in 2002–2003, 2004–2013.  On the 2007 norm-referenced Florida Comprehensive Assessment Test (FCAT), Nova students performed nationally at the 75th percentile in reading and 82nd percentile in math.  Nova faculty have, on average, 12 years of teaching experience and 49% hold advanced degrees.  Average class size is 25 and the student stability rate is 97%.

County-sanctioned athletic programs 
 
 Basketball (Boys' and Girls')
 Baseball (Boys')
 Bowling
 Cross Country (Boys' and Girls')
 Diving (Boys' and Girls')
 American football (Boys')
 Flag football (Girls')
 Soccer (Boys' and Girls')
 Swimming (sport) (Boys' and Girls')
 Diving (sport) (Boys' and Girls')
 Track and Field (Boys' and Girls')
 Tennis (Boys' and Girls')
 Softball (Girls')
 Volleyball (Boys' and Girls')
 Wrestling (Boys')
 Water Polo (Boys' and Girls')
 Golf Team (Boys' and Girls')
 Step Team (Boys' and Girls')
Cheerleading

Debate team 
Members of the Nova High School speech and debate team have won nine National Championships since the year 2000: Jeff Hannan in Student Congress (2000), Scott Jacobson in Student Congress (2002), Matt Futch in Student Congress (2004), Allison Pena in Extemp Commentary (2007), Jared Odessky in Domestic Extemporaneous Speaking and Jamaque Newberry in Dramatic Interpretation (2011), Gregory Bernstein in Congressional Debate (2013), Craig Heyne in Prose Reading (2016), and the team of Cornelia Fraser and Rafey Khan in Public Forum Debate (2017).

Baseball team 
Coach Pat McQuaid has led the Nova Titans baseball team for 42 years. To honor the coach's service to the school, the baseball field was named Pat McQuaid Field. Recent accomplishments include state championships in 2004 and 2005. In each of those years, the Titans were ranked #1 in the nation by both Baseball America and Collegiate Baseball. In April 2010, Coach McQuaid was inducted into the F.H.S.A.A. (Florida High School Athletic Association) Hall of Fame for his lifelong contribution to coaching high school baseball in the State of Florida.

Former Nova High School players to see game time with a Major League Baseball team include Doug Johns (Baltimore Orioles and Oakland Athletics), Harry Chappas (Chicago White Sox), Michael Morse (San Francisco Giants), Jeff Fiorentino (Baltimore Orioles), Anthony Swarzak (Minnesota Twins), and Tyler Kinley (Colorado Rockies).

Swim, dive, and water polo teams 
Since 1968, Nova High School's Swim, Dive, and Water Polo Teams have earned 1 National Record, 1 National Champion, 183 All-Americans, 8 National Scholar Team Awards, 7 Team State Championships (12-Time Runner-up), and 58 Individual State Titles. From 2006 to 2015.

Drama club 
Nova High School's Drama Club has participated in the Florida State Thespian Festival and received Excellents, Superiors, honorable mentions, and critics choice. The Weight of Words is an anti-bullying show written by Nova High students and the Lovewell Institute, and performed throughout Florida by current students enrolled in the acting class. This play is a "call for action" for all audience members that will transform any audience into agents of change. The Weight of Words is becoming widely known and is now being performed in other states and schools.

Notable alumni

Entertainment 
Woody Alpern host of the financial talk radio show “CPA Wealth Advisors”, airs every Saturday and Sunday at 10 am on Atlanta's News Radio 106.7 FM
 Jeff Garlin, Class of 1980, comedian and actor/producer of Curb Your Enthusiasm, star of The Goldbergs
 Paige O'Hara, voice of Belle from Disney's Beauty and the Beast
 Scott Storch, Grammy Award–winning music producer
 Uffie (Anna-Catherine Hartley), Electro music artist
 Justin D. Jacobson, Class of 1988, award-winning game designer and publisher
 David Bianculli, Class of 1971, television critic for National Public Radio
 Corinne Kaplan, Survivor contestant on Survivor: Gabon and Survivor: Caramoan

News 
Glenn Greenwald, Class of 1985, journalist and author
Alison Kosik, CNN business correspondent
Marie Murray Martin, Class of 1981, founder of the Elberta Arts Center and award-winning education writer 
Cary Tennis, Class of 1971, writer for Salon.com

Athletics 
Football
 Autry Denson, Class of 1995, running back, all-time rushing yards leader at Notre Dame; running backs coach
 Tyrus McCloud, Class of 1993 – linebacker, went to NFL
 Chris Gamble, cornerback, Carolina Panthers (2004–2012)
 Omar Smith, center, New York Giants (2002–2004)

Baseball
 Harry Chappas, MLB shortstop with Chicago White Sox (1978–1980)
 Jeff Fiorentino, MLB outfielder with Baltimore Orioles (2005–2006, 2009) and Oakland Athletics (2008)
 Doug Johns, MLB pitcher with Oakland Athletics (1995–1996) and Baltimore Orioles (1998–1999)
 Tyler Kinley, MLB pitcher with the Minnesota Twins (2018)
 Mike Morse, Class of 2000, MLB outfielder/first baseman with several teams
 Anthony Swarzak, MLB pitcher with several teams
Basketball
 Mickey Dillard, NBA player for Cleveland Cavaliers (1981–1982); played collegiately at Florida State University
 Jim Thomas, played in NBA for Indiana Pacers (1983–1985), Los Angeles Clippers (1985–1986) and Minnesota Timberwolves (1990–1991); played collegiately at the University of Indiana
Soccer
 Cory Gibbs, professional soccer player for several teams and the U.S. national team

Other 
 Robert F. Coleman, professor of mathematics at the University of California, Berkeley
 Nathan Connolly, Class of 1995, historian. Herbert Baxter Adams Associate Professor of History at Johns Hopkins University.
 Chesley V. Morton, Class of 1969, Georgia House of Representatives 1983–1991
 Kevyn D. Orr, Class of 1979, City of Detroit emergency financial manager
 Brian A. Skiff, Class of 1973, noted astronomer at Lowell Observatory, Flagstaff, AZ
 Ben Stark, Class of 2001, Hall of Fame American Magic: The Gathering player.

References

External links 
 Nova High (official site)

High schools in Broward County, Florida
Public high schools in Florida
Davie, Florida
Educational institutions established in 1960
1960 establishments in Florida